Michael Dean Keathley (born March 9, 1978) is a former American football guard in the National Football League (NFL) who played for the San Diego Chargers. 

In 2003, Keathley was claimed by the Houston Texans after being waived by the Chargers, but he did not play any games for the Texans and re-signed with the Chargers later that year. In 2004, Keathley signed a one-year contract with the Chicago Bears, though he did not play.

Keathley played college football at Texas Christian University.

After his career in the NFL, he settled in Athens, Pennsylvania with his wife and three sons. He began to volunteer as a football coach; he has coached all three of his sons in high school football.

References 

1978 births
Living people
Sportspeople from Arlington, Texas
Players of American football from Texas
American football offensive guards
TCU Horned Frogs football players
San Diego Chargers players
Houston Texans players
People from Glen Rose, Texas